Rick Rozz (born Frederick D. DeLillo, January 9, 1967) is an American guitarist. He grew up in Brooklyn, New York and spent his formative years in Altamonte Springs, Florida, attending Lake Brantley High School.  He is best known for his work with the death metal bands Death and Massacre. He still resides in Florida.

He played on and co-wrote the well-known death-metal releases Leprosy in 1988, From Beyond in 1990, the EP Inhuman Condition in 1991 and the more rock-oriented LP Promise in 1996. He also wrote the music for the 2014 Massacre release Back From Beyond on Century Media Records.

In 2019 Rick reformed Massacre with original Mantas/Death/Massacre singer Kam Lee along with original Massacre bassist Michael Borders, and drummer Mike Mazzonetto (Pain Principle/Massacre) who played on the 2014 release Back From Beyond. 
At this time Massacre is playing weekend dates worldwide in 2019 and plan to continue in 2020.

References

1966 births
Death (metal band) members
American heavy metal guitarists
Living people
Guitarists from Florida
Lake Brantley High School alumni
20th-century American guitarists
Massacre (metal band) members